Nosferatu is an upcoming American gothic horror film written and directed by Robert Eggers, and starring Bill Skarsgård as the titular vampire. It serves as the second remake of the 1922 German Expressionist film of the same name written by Henrik Galeen, which in turn is an "unauthorized and unofficial" adaptation of Bram Stoker's 1897 novel Dracula, following Nosferatu the Vampyre (1979).

Nosferatu is a co-production of Regency Enterprises, Studio 8, Square Peg, and 1492 Pictures, and is set to be released theatrically by Focus Features.

Cast 
 Bill Skarsgård as Count Orlok
 Lily-Rose Depp as Ellen Hutter
 Nicholas Hoult as Thomas Hutter 
 Willem Dafoe as Professor Albin Eberhart Von Franz 
 Emma Corrin as Anna Harding
 Aaron Taylor-Johnson as Friedrich Harding
 Simon McBurney as Herr Knock
 Ralph Ineson as Dr. Wilhelm Sievers

Production 
In July 2015, a remake of Nosferatu was announced with Robert Eggers writing and directing. The film was intended to be produced by Jay Van Hoy and Lars Knudsen for Studio 8. In November 2016, Eggers expressed surprise that the Nosferatu remake was going to be his second film, saying, "It feels ugly and blasphemous and egomaniacal and disgusting for a filmmaker in my place to do Nosferatu next. I was really planning on waiting a while, but that's how fate shook out." During an interview with Den of Geek around the release of The Lighthouse in 2019, Robert Eggers revealed that although he has dedicated a lot of time to bringing the iconic horror movie into the 21st century, he doesn't know when or if it will happen after all. Despite that, Eggers said: "Look, I spent so many years and so much time, just so much blood on it, yeah, it would be a real shame if it never happened". In February 2022, again during an interview with Den of Geek around the release of The Northman, Eggers was asked if he and Anya Taylor-Joy still communicate about the project and he says: "We definitely talk about it, and I don't know why it's been so hard to make happen." In March 2022, Harry Styles dropped out of an undisclosed role in film, citing scheduling conflicts.

On September 30, 2022, it was announced that Bill Skarsgård was set to play the main character of the film while Lily-Rose Depp also was in talks to co-star. Skarsgård was originally cast in Eggers' The Northman, but dropped out due to scheduling conflicts. Nicholas Hoult would entered negotiations the following month, with all three confirmed to star by January 2023 alongside the addition of Willem Dafoe, who previously starred as Max Schreck in Shadow of the Vampire, which depicted a fictional version of the production of 1922's Nosferatu. Emma Corrin would join the cast the following month. In March 2023, production began in Prague, with Aaron Taylor-Johnson, Simon McBurney and Ralph Ineson added to the cast.

References

External links
 

2020s horror films
1492 Pictures films
American horror films
American supernatural horror films
Dracula films
Films based on horror novels
Films directed by Robert Eggers
Films produced by Chris Columbus
Films set in Germany
Films set in the 1830s
Films set in Transylvania
Films shot in Prague
Focus Features films
Nosferatu
Reboot films
Regency Enterprises films